The Treaty of Greenville, formally titled Treaty with the Wyandots, etc., was a 1795 treaty between the United States and indigenous nations of the Northwest Territory (now Midwestern United States), including the Wyandot and Delaware peoples, that redefined the boundary between indigenous peoples' lands and territory for European American community settlement.

It was signed at Fort Greenville, now Greenville, Ohio, on August 3, 1795, following the Native American loss at the Battle of Fallen Timbers a year earlier. It ended the Northwest Indian War in the Ohio Country, limited Indian country to northwestern Ohio, and began the practice of annual payments following the land concessions. The parties to the treaty were a coalition of Native American tribes known as the Western Confederacy, and the United States government represented by General Anthony Wayne and local frontiersmen.

The treaty became synonymous with the end of the frontier in that part of the Northwest Territory that would become the new state of Ohio.

Participants

General "Mad Anthony" Wayne, who had led the US army victory at Fallen Timbers and a subsequent scorched earth campaign of destroying villages, led the US government delegation. Other members included William Wells, William Henry Harrison, William Clark, Caleb Swan, and Meriwether Lewis.

Native American leaders who signed the treaty included leaders of these bands and tribes: Wyandot (chiefs Tarhe, Roundhead, and Leatherlips), Delaware (several bands). Shawnee (chiefs Blue Jacket and Black Hoof), Ottawa (several bands, including Egushawa), Chippewa, Potawatomi (23 signatories, including Gomo, Siggenauk, Black Partridge, Topinabee, and Five Medals), Miami (including Jean Baptiste Richardville, White Loon, and Little Turtle), Wea, Kickapoo, and Kaskaskia.

Following their defeat at Fallen Timbers, Wayne had courted the favor of several key leaders within the Western Confederacy. Blue Jacket, the Shawnee war chief who had led the Native American force at Fallen Timbers, encouraged others to accept Wayne's terms for peace. Tarhe declared that the victory at Fallen Timbers was evidence that the Great Spirit favored the United States. Opposition to the United States was led by Little Turtle who, ironically, had advised against engaging Wayne at Fallen Timbers. For a week, Wayne urged the native tribes to accept peace based on previous terms at the Treaty of Fort McIntosh, Treaty of Fort Finney, and Treaty of Fort Harmar, but Little Turtle countered that the Miami Tribe were not party to these treaties and would not recognize them, and that they were invalid because they were made with people who had no right to the lands that they had sold.

Wayne revealed that the U.S. Senate had recently ratified the Jay Treaty, ensuring that Great Britain would no longer provide aid to the Native Americans. Tarhe confirmed that previous treaties had been signed by chiefs who were at Greenville and warned his fellow Indigenous tribal leaders that Wayne had the military power to take all of their lands if they did not negotiate. Little Turtle and the Miami remained the lone dissent in the confederacy. At a private council between Wayne and Little Turtle on August 12, Wayne argued that the Miami chief was standing against the will of the confederate majority. Little Turtle reluctantly signed, stating that he was the last to sign, and would therefore be the last to break the treaty, even though he disagreed with the terms.

The day after the Treaty of Greenville was signed, Little Turtle's wife died in camp. She was carried to a grave by US Soldiers and given a three gun salute.

The treaty was signed by President George Washington and ratified by the United States Senate on December 22, 1795.

Terms
The treaty consisted of ten articles.

Land for annuity
The treaty established what became known as the Greenville Treaty Line, as delineated below. For several years, it distinguished Native American territory from lands open to European-American settlers, who, however, continued to encroach. In exchange for goods to the value of $20,000 (such as blankets, utensils, and domestic animals), the Native American tribes ceded to the United States large parts of modern-day Ohio.

The treaty also established the "annuity" system of payment in return for Native American cessions of land east of the treaty line. Yearly grants of federal money and supplies of calico cloth to Native American tribes. That institutionalized continuing government influence in tribal affairs and gave outsiders considerable control over Native American life.

Treaty line

The treaty redefined with slight modifications the boundaries in Ohio established previously by the Treaty of Fort McIntosh in 1785 and reasserted in the Treaty of Fort Harmar in 1789. In particular, the western boundary, which formerly ran northwesterly to the Maumee River, now ran southerly to the Ohio River.

Ohio had developed settlements and defined tracts of land prior to 1795, including the Western Reserve, the Seven Ranges survey area, the Virginia Military District, Symmes Purchase, and two Ohio Company purchases, all in eastern and southern Ohio, as well as the line of western forts built by Wayne through Fort Recovery along the Great Miami River valley. The boundary line would need to encompass all those territories, covering about two thirds of Ohio Country, within Whiteman's land.

The treaty line began at the mouth of the Cuyahoga River in present-day Cleveland and ran south along the river to the portage between the Cuyahoga and Tuscarawas Rivers in what is now known as the Portage Lakes area between Akron and Canton. The line continued down the Tuscarawas to Fort Laurens, near present-day Bolivar. From there, the line ran west-southwest to near present-day Fort Loramie on a branch of the Great Miami River. From there, the line ran west-northwest to Fort Recovery on the Wabash River near the present-day boundary between Ohio and Indiana. From Fort Recovery, the line ran south-southwest to the Ohio River at a point opposite the mouth of the Kentucky River in present-day Carrollton, Kentucky. Rufus Putnam, who had been appointed by George Washington as surveyor general of the United States, surveyed and marked the Treaty Line.

Other parcels of land
There were also other forts along the Great Lakes, such as Fort Miamis and other forts in Indiana, Michigan, and Ohio that the British had agreed to cede to the United States in the 1783 Treaty of Paris but had yet to evacuate. In Indiana, there was the Vincennes Tract, Clark's Grant, and the settlement at Ouiatenon to protect.

The treaty also permitted established US Army posts and allocated strategic reserved tracts within the Indian Country to the north and the west of the ceded lands, the most important of which was the future site of Fort Dearborn (now Downtown Chicago) on Lake Michigan. Other American lands within Indian Country included Fort Detroit, Ouiatenon, Fort Wayne, Fort Miami, and Fort Sandusky.

The treaty exempted established settlements at Vincennes, Clark's Grant, various French settlements, and Fort Massac from relinquishment.

Miscellaneous provisions
The United States renounced all claims to indigenous peoples' lands not within the treaty line in Ohio or parcels exempted. The indigenous groups were obliged to recognize the United States as the sole sovereign power in the entire territory, but the local peoples would otherwise have free use of their own lands as long as they were kindly disposed to American settlers. The treaty also arranged for an exchange of prisoners and specified the parties that would be responsible for enforcing the boundary and punishing transgressions.

Criticism
After the signing of the treaty, the so-called "peace chiefs", such as Little Turtle, who advocated cooperation with the United States, were roundly criticized by Shawnee chief Tecumseh, who stated that the peace chiefs had given away land that they did not own. Therefore Tecumseh fought against the Americans during the War of 1812, and was finally defeated in 1813.

Aftermath

The negotiated peace was only temporary. Continuing encroachments by settlers on Indian Country north and west of the treaty line (and of future treaty lines established by the Treaty of Vincennes, Treaty of Grouseland, and Treaty of Fort Wayne of 1809), especially in Indiana, would lead a disgruntled Tecumseh, who had not signed the Treaty of Greenville, to reform the Confederacy at Prophetstown over the following decade. Unrest among the tribes culminated in the Battle of Tippecanoe in 1811, a major defeat for indigenous nations that may have contributed to their siding with the British in the War of 1812.

The Treaty of Greenville closed the frontier in the Northwest Territory. Thereafter began a series of purchases of indigenous peoples' lands by treaty and Indigenous tribe removals by law throughout the territory and its successors, interrupted briefly by the War of 1812. Indians were moved west of the Mississippi River to Indian Country reservations in what later became the state of Oklahoma in a process that culminated with the dismantling of the Great Miami Reserve in Indiana by treaties in the 1830s. By 1840, the Old Northwest was essentially clear of indigenous peoples. Future conflicts would all be west of the Mississippi.

The treaty line would become the southwestern boundary of the Northwest Territory at its division in 1800. Upon Ohio statehood in 1803, the western boundary of Ohio ran due north from a place on the Ohio River somewhat east of the south-southwesterly treaty line, leaving a sliver of land called "The Gore" in what is today southeastern Indiana remaining as part of the Northwest Territory. "The Gore" was ceded to Indiana Territory at that time, and became Dearborn County in March 1803.

Among the signers were Meriwether Lewis and William Clark, who met for the first time here and would go on to launch the Lewis and Clark Expedition in 1804 to claim the Louisiana Purchase for the United States. In addition, William Henry Harrison, another signer would later become the 9th President of the United States in 1841.

Fort Greenville was abandoned in 1796; it would be another 12 years before the settlement of Greenville, Ohio, was founded on the site.

It was the last treaty signed by Gen. Wayne, who died just over a year later, in December 1796.

Depictions
A painting commemorating the treaty hangs in the Ohio Statehouse. It was completed by Ohio artist Howard Chandler Christy.

Gallery

See also
List of Indige American treaties

Notes

References

External links

 Video explaining painting at the Ohio Statehouse
 Treaty of Greenville at National Archives and Records Administration
 Treaty of Greenville from Yale Law School

Greenville
Greenville
Greenville
Miami tribe
Northwest Indian War
Shawnee history
Greenville
Greenville, Ohio
1795 in the Northwest Territory